Sebastián Hugo Grazzini (born 25 January 1981) is a retired Argentine footballer who played as an attacking midfielder.

Career
Grazzini has played for a number of clubs in Argentina, Spain, Belgium, Venezuela and Italy. He began his career in the youth ranks of Central Córdoba. He impressed while with Central Córdoba and was signed by Spain's Sevilla FC, playing with the club's reserve side Sevilla Atlético. He then went on to play for
Virton in Belgium before returning to Central Córdoba the following season. After a brief stop with Unión de Sunchales Grazzini left Argentina and signed with Venezuela's Italchaco. While with Italchaco Grazzini appeared in 15 matches and scored 6 goals. He then returned to Europe for the 2007–08 season joining Italy's Sestrese. While in Italy Grazzini was at top form scoring 22 goals in 45 matches.

In 2008, he returned to Argentina to play for Newell's Old Boys, the team his entire family has supported. Grazzini scored his first goal for Newell's in a 4–0 away win over Argentinos Juniors. On 13 March 2009, Racing Club de Avellaneda signed the midfielder on a free transfer. While with Racing Grazzini appeared in 34 matches and scored 5 goals, his most productive season in Argentina. Subsequently, for the 2010–11 season, Grazzini joined All Boys. He appeared in 22 matches for All Boys scoring 5 goals.

In June 2011 it was reported that Grazzini would be joining Major League Soccer side Chicago Fire on a one-year deal. The Fire officially announced signing Grazzini on 13 July 2011.
On 17 August 2012, Chicago Fire loaned Grazzini to Atlético de Rafaela for the remainder of the MLS season.

References

External links

Sebastián Grazzini – Argentine Primera statistics at Fútbol XXI  
BDFA profile 
sport.sky.it 

1984 births
Living people
Argentine footballers
Argentine expatriate footballers
Footballers from Rosario, Santa Fe
Association football midfielders
Newell's Old Boys footballers
Central Córdoba de Rosario footballers
Racing Club de Avellaneda footballers
All Boys footballers
R.E. Virton players
Deportivo Italia players
Rangers de Talca footballers
Nueva Chicago footballers
Club Atlético Douglas Haig players
Sportivo Las Parejas footballers
Chicago Fire FC players
F.S. Sestrese Calcio 1919 players
Atlético de Rafaela footballers
Club Atlético Patronato footballers
Flandria footballers
Asteras Tripolis F.C. players
Argentine Primera División players
Primera B de Chile players
Super League Greece players
Major League Soccer players
Argentine expatriate sportspeople in Chile
Argentine expatriate sportspeople in Venezuela
Argentine expatriate sportspeople in the United States
Argentine expatriate sportspeople in Greece
Argentine expatriate sportspeople in Italy
Expatriate footballers in Chile
Expatriate footballers in Venezuela
Expatriate footballers in Italy
Expatriate soccer players in the United States
Expatriate footballers in Greece